The president of the Chamber of Deputies is the presiding officer of the lower chamber of the National Congress of Bolivia. The president is currently elected for a one-year term.

Below is a list of office-holders.

See also
 President of the Senate of Bolivia

References

Chamber of Deputies, Presidents
Bolivia, Chamber of Deputies
Presidents of the Chamber of Deputies (Bolivia)
1825 establishments in Bolivia